Under the Radar is a 2004 Australian adventure comedy film directed by Evan Clarry and starring Nathan Phillips, Clayton Watson, Steady Eddy and Chloe Maxwell. It was filmed in the Gold Coast, Queensland, Australia.

Cast
Nathan Phillips as Brandon
Clayton Watson as Adrian
Steady Eddy as Trevor
Chloe Maxwell as Jo
Robert Menzies as Ched
Syd Brisbane as Garry
Gyton Grantley as Trent
Teo Gebert as Ash
Damien Garvey as Gene
Robert Rabiah as Mario
Steve Mouzakis as Lee
Rory Williamson as Ricardo
Marg Downey as Maxine

Reception
Australia's SBS review of the film noted an indecisiveness of what genre was intended, yet concluding the production "harks back to a more innocent era of Australian film making and has all the elements of becoming a cult film in years to come".

Awards
The film was nominated for the Australian Film Institute award for Best Actress in a Leading Role (Chloe Maxwell) and won the Australian Screen Sound Guild award for Best Achievement in Sound for a Feature Film - Sound Design in 2004.

Box office
Under the Radar grossed $162,757 at the box office in Australia.

See also
Cinema of Australia

References

External links
Under the Radar at the National Film and Sound Archive
 
 

2004 films
2000s adventure comedy films
2000s comedy thriller films
2000s adventure thriller films
Australian comedy thriller films
Films about kidnapping
Films about amnesia
Films about friendship
Films set in Australia
Films set on beaches
Films shot in Australia
Jungle adventure films
2004 comedy films
2000s English-language films